Hwayi: A Monster Boy is a 2013 South Korean action film about a 16-year-old boy of the same name (played by Yeo Jin-goo) who is raised by five criminal fathers to become the perfect assassin. It takes pulling the trigger to discover his true identity after he realizes the mystery surrounding his past and his fate. It was the highly anticipated second feature film by director Jang Joon-hwan, a decade after his 2003 cult favorite sci-fi comedy/thriller Save the Green Planet!.

Plot
In the middle of a forest, a notorious five-member crime organization lives together on a deserted farm. One day, following a plan
that didn't go as expected, an infant whom they had kidnapped in a blackmailing scheme is left with them. 14 years later,
this boy, who is now named Hwa-yi, lives as the son of his five criminal fathers: Seok-tae, the cold but charismatic leader, Ki-tae, a stammering driving expert, Jin-seong, an ideal planner, Beom-soo, a guns expert, and Dong-beom a cold martial artist. Hwa-yi has been brought up in a unique way, learning skills from his five fathers instead of going to school. Though he has adapted to this life, sometimes he longs for the ordinary life of other boys, which seems impossible for him.

The gang plans another crime, which will see Hwa-yi participate for the first time. During a fight, Hwa-yi fires a gun to kill
someone. At first, his fingers tremble and the gun shakes but after one shot, he keeps pulling the trigger as though
possessed. He finds a picture of a child on the man he shot and soon Hwa-yi starts to uncover a huge secret and his
tragic destiny. His life is turned upside down when he learns that the man he killed was his real father. From that moment on, Hwa-yi vows revenge on his gangster fathers, using the devious skills he picked up from a life in crime.

Hwa-yi begins by killing one of five fathers. The rest of them go after him but lose him. Hwa-yi calls them all to Sungji Cement Factory. He also writes a letter to the rival gang and they show up an hour before. Both groups get into a feud. Hwa-yi positions himself at a high vantage point and snipes the men. Soon, everyone is dead except for Seok-tae and Hwa-yi. Seok-tae heads to the hospital where Hwa-yi's mother is admitted, Hwa-yi follows.

To Hwa-yi's mother at the hospital, Seok-tae reveals the story all the way from the orphanage to the kidnapping to raising her child. After this, he kills her and goes back home. Hwa-yi reaches the hospital too late, he goes home to confront Seok-tae. The detective who's been after the notorious gang is also there. The three of them have a standoff. Seok-tae kills the detective and Hwa-yi kills Seok-tae. He dies with a smile because his “son” is now the monster he always wanted him to become. The film ends with Hwayi sniping the CEO of the rival gang and disappearing into the crowds.

Cast
Kim Yoon-seok - Seok-tae
Yeo Jin-goo - Hwa-yi
Cho Jin-woong - Ki-tae
Jang Hyun-sung - Jin-seong
Kim Sung-kyun - Dong-beom
Park Hae-joon - Beom-soo
Park Yong-woo - Detective Chang-ho
Lee Geung-young - Im Hyung-taek
Yoo Yeon-seok - Park Ji-won
Moon Sung-keun - CEO Jin
Jang In-sub as Detective Chang-Ho	
Nam Ji-hyun - Yoo-kyung
Seo Young-hwa - Im Hyung-taek's wife
Im Ji-eun - Young-joo
Kim Young-min - Detective Jung-min
Woo Jung-gook - blind masseur
Lee Jun-hyeok - police officer who sees Hwa-yi entering the house
Han Sung-yong - police officer checking for drunk driving

Box office
Released on October 9, 2013, known as Hangul Day, a national holiday in South Korea, Hwayi: A Monster Boy opened strong at the box office, reaching 1.2 million admissions over its first five days.

Remake
Lee Jun-dong, head of Hwayi'''s production company Now Film, will co-produce an English-language remake with U.S.-based Spanish producer Frida Torresblanco (Pan's Labyrinth''). Lee said, "We have decided to take part in the production as a collaborator in order to ensure the quality of the remake, rather than simply handing over the storyline."

Awards and nominations

References

External links

South Korean action thriller films
2013 films
Showbox films
2010s South Korean films